Esteghlal Khuzestan Football Club (Bašgâh-e Futbâl-e Esteqlâl-e Xuzestân), commonly known as Esteghlal Khuzestan, is an Iranian football club based in Ahvaz, Iran. The club currently competes in the Azadegan League after being relegated from Persian Gulf Pro League in the 2018–19 season.

This football club is different from Esteghlal Ahvaz. In 2011 they bought Esteghlal Jonub's licence to compete in the Azadegan League. They finished 2012–13 season in 2nd place of their group and qualified to the promotion play-off. However, they were awarded the direct promotion IRIFF after group's winner, Shahrdari Tabriz's relegation due to match-fixing. They won the Persian Gulf Pro League title in 2015–16 season.

History

Founding and early years
Esteghlal Khuzestan F.C. was established just before the start of the 2011–2012 season by acquiring the license of Esteghlal Jonub Tehran F.C. who has just been promoted to the Azadegan League (Iran's 1st division). After an average 6th-place finish in the team's inaugural year in the Azadegan League in 2011–2012, the next season (2012–13) turned out to be a different year, with a 2nd-placed finish in group B, the club was promoted to the Iran Pro League for the first time in their history.

Promotion to the Pro League
In Esteghlal Khuzestan's first year in the top flight, it finished 12th, escaping relegation play-off by better goal difference. In the Hazfi Cup Esteghlal Khuzestan exited the competition in the Round of 32 after a shock defeat to Azadegan League side Alvand Hamedan. Esteghlal finished the 2014–15 season 14th, meaning it would have to play in a relegation play-off against the winner of the Azadegan League promotion play-off winner. Esteghlal Khuzestan defeated Mes Kerman 3–0 on aggregate meaning it had secured a spot in the 2015–16 Persian Gulf Pro League season.

2015–16 season

Before the start of the 2015–16 season Esteghlal Khuzestan signed many of Foolad Novin's players and was a major surprise, as it started well in the season. Esteghlal Khuzestan had four consecutive winning streak at the 12th week, which made Esteghlal Khuzestan finished champion of the first half of the season. After a great result with Abdollah Veisi, Esteghlal Khuzestan managed to keep its shape at the second half of the season. On January 1, 2016 Esteghlal Khuzestan lost to Persepolis which made the race tighter for first place, and also made Esteghlal Khuzestan fall to second place, Esteghlal became first after 17th week. The head coach Abdollah Veisi later said that their main goal was to take place at AFC Champions League. Esteghlal Khuzestan qualified to the AFC Champions League on 8 May, for the first time in its history. Esteghlal Khuzestan won the league title on 13 May after a 2–0 win over Zob Ahan.

Relegation
Following a poor start to the following season, 6 points were deduced from Esteghlal Khuzestan by FIFA. Dariush Yazdi was sacked and Karim Boostani replaced the coach. Results ultimately did not improve under Boostani and he was replaced with Mohammad Alavi. Esteghlal Khuzestan were relegated from the Persian Gulf Pro League to Azadegan League on 3 May 2019, after a 4–2 loss to Esteghlal.

Stadium

After the takeover of the club in 2011, the club played its home matches in Ahvaz's Takhti Stadium. After the club promoted to the Iran Pro League, it was decided that club continuing to play at Takthi, while big games like Persepolis, Esteghlal and Foolad playing at newly built Ghadir Stadium. In 2015, the club moved to Ghadir permanently, as city rivals Foolad set to move to its private ground.

Rivals
The team competes in Ahvaz derby against two-times Iran Pro League winner Foolad. The teams play against each other usually two times a year. The first time the teams met each other was in season 2013–14 which Esteghlal Khuzestan lost that game.

The derby became more Serious after Esteghlal Khuzestan finished on top of the league in 2015–16 half season in a big surprise for all teams and the week performance of Foolad. Because of Foolad fans as they were worried about becoming the second team of Ahvaz and since then the derby is more important than it used to be.

Honours

Domestic competitions

League
Persian Gulf Pro League:
 Winners (1): 2015–16
Azadegan League:
 Winners (1): 2012–13

Cup
Super Cup
Runners-up (1): 2016

Season-by-season
The table below shows the achievements of the club in various competitions.

Continental record

Players

First-team squad

For recent transfers, see List of Iranian football transfers winter 2018–19''.

Officials

Coaching staff

List of managers

2020
| Amir khalife asl (caretaker)

Players in International Tournaments 
Players who were a member of their national team at International Competitions while playing for Esteghlal Khuzestan.

See also
 Esteghlal Tehran Football Club
 Esteghlal Ahvaz Football Club
 Esteghlal Dushanbe Football Club

References

External links

Official website 

 
Football clubs in Iran
Association football clubs established in 2011
2011 establishments in Iran
Sport in Ahvaz